Aurora is a 2018 Kyrgyzstani drama film directed by Bekzat Pirmatov. It was selected as the Kyrgyz entry for the Best International Feature Film at the 92nd Academy Awards, but it was not nominated.

Cast
 Kanatbek Abdyrakhmanov as Waiter
 Marat Amiraev as Freak
 Erika Baibosunova as Young girl
 Albina Imasheva as Queen
 Dina Jakob as Girl

See also
 List of submissions to the 92nd Academy Awards for Best International Feature Film
 List of Kyrgyz submissions for the Academy Award for Best International Feature Film

References

External links
 

2018 films
2018 drama films
Kyrgyzstani drama films
Kyrgyz-language films